The Roman Septuagint, also known as the Sixtine Septuagint (Sixtine ) or the Roman Sixtine Septuagint (sometimes Roman (Sixtine) Septuagint, Roman edition of the Septuagint or Vetus Testamentum Iuxta Septuaginta), is an edition of the Septuagint published in 1587, and commissioned by Pope Sixtus V.

The printing of the book "was worked off in 1586, but the work was not published until May 1587." Hence why a second  on the publication date of the book "has been added in many copies with the pen."

This edition is based on the Codex Vaticanus. The text of this edition of the Septuagint became mostly the standard for all the later editions of the Septuagint for three centuries after its publication, until Rahlf published his edition of the Septuagint which became the new standard.

Antonio Carafa directed the work on the edition of the Roman Septuagint. The Roman Septuagint was published "by the authority of Sixtus V, to assist the revisers who were preparing the Latin Vulgate edition ordered by the Council of Trent."

See also 

 Sixtine Vulgate
 Aldine Bible

References

External links 
Original edition:

 
 

Other

Further reading 

1587 books
Editions of the Septuagint
Pope Sixtus V
16th-century Christian texts
Early printed Bibles
16th-century Catholicism